The 1988 Skate America was held at the Cumberland County Civic Center in Portland, Maine. Medals were awarded in the disciplines of men's singles, ladies' singles, pair skating, and ice dancing.

Results

Men

Ladies

Pairs

Ice dancing
CD1: Westminster Waltz 
CD2: Yankee Polka

External links
 Skate Canada results

Skate America, 1988
Skate America